There have been three baronetcies created for persons with the surname Ball, one in the Baronetage of England and two in the Baronetage of the United Kingdom.

The Ball Baronetcy, of Mamhead in the County of Devon, was created in the Baronetage of England on 22 July 1672 for Peter Ball. However, some sources claim that the patent never passed the Great Seal and Peter Ball and his sons never used the title.

The Ball Baronetcy, of Blofield in the County of Norfolk, was created in the Baronetage of the United Kingdom on 24 June 1801 for the naval commander and colonial administrator Alexander Ball. The title became extinct on the death of the second Baronet in 1874.

The Ball Baronetcy, of Merrion Square in the County and City Dublin and of Killybegs in the County of Donegal, was created in the Baronetage of the United Kingdom on 23 June 1911 for the Irish surgeon Charles Ball. He was Regius Professor of Surgery at Trinity College Dublin, and President of the Royal Academy of Medicine of Ireland. His eldest son, the second Baronet, was also Regius Professor of Surgery. He died without male issue and was succeeded by his younger brother, the third Baronet. He was Professor of Botany at University College, Colombo, Sr Lanka. As of 2007 the title is held by the latter's grandson, the fifth Baronet, who succeeded his father in 2002.

Ball baronets, of Mamhead (1672)
Sir Peter Ball, 1st Baronet (died 1680)

Ball baronets, of Blofield (1801)
Sir Alexander John Ball, 1st Baronet (1757–1809)
Sir William Keith Ball, 2nd Baronet (1791–1874)

Ball baronets, of Merrion Square and Killybegs (1911)
Sir Charles Bent Ball, 1st Baronet (1851–1916)
Sir Charles Arthur Kinahan Ball, 2nd Baronet (1877–1945)
Sir Nigel Gresley Ball, 3rd Baronet (1892–1978)
Sir Charles Irwin Ball, 4th Baronet (1924–2002)
Sir Richard Bentley Ball, 5th Baronet (born 1953)

Notes

References
Kidd, Charles, Williamson, David (editors). Debrett's Peerage and Baronetage (1990 edition). New York: St Martin's Press, 1990, 

 

Baronetcies in the Baronetage of the United Kingdom
Extinct baronetcies in the Baronetage of England
Extinct baronetcies in the Baronetage of the United Kingdom